The Roman Catholic Archdiocese of Campinas is an archdiocese located in the city of Campinas in Brazil.

History
 June 7, 1908: Established as Diocese of Campinas from the Diocese of São Paulo
 April 19, 1958: Promoted as Metropolitan Archdiocese of Campinas

Special churches
Minor Basilicas:
Basílica Nossa Senhora do Carmo

Bishops

Ordinaries, in reverse chronological order
 Archbishops of Campinas (Roman rite), below
 Archbishop João Inácio Müller, O.F.M. (since 2019.05.15)
 Archbishop Airton José dos Santos (2012.02.15 - 2018.04.25), appointed Archbishop of Mariana, Minas Gerais
 Archbishop Bruno Gamberini (2004.08.01 – 2011.08.28)
 Archbishop Gilberto Pereira Lopes (1982.02.10 – 2004.08.01)
 Archbishop Antônio Maria Alves de Siqueira (1968.09.19 – 1982.02.10)
 Archbishop Paulo de Tarso Campos (1958.04.19 – 1968.09.19) see below
 Bishops of Campinas (Roman Rite), below
 Bishop Paulo de Tarso Campos (later Archbishop) (1941.12.14 – 1958.04.19) see above
 Bishop Francisco de Campos Barreto (1920.07.30 – 1941.08.22)
 Bishop João Batista Corrêa Nery (1908.08.03 – 1920.02.01)

Coadjutor archbishops
Antônio Maria Alves de Siqueira (1966-1968)
Gilberto Pereira Lopes (1975-1982)

Auxiliary bishops
Joaquim Mamede da Silva (1916-1947)
Bernardo José Bueno Miele (1962-1967), appointed  Coadjutor Archbishop of Ribeirão Preto, São Paulo
Luiz Antônio Guedes (1997-2001) appointed Bishop of Bauru, São Paulo

Other priests of this diocese who became bishops
Octávio Augusto Chagas de Miranda, appointed Bishop of Pouso Alegre in 1916
Agnelo Rossi, appointed Bishop of Barra do Piraí in 1956; future Cardinal
Ercílio Turco, appointed Bishop of Limeira, São Paulo in 1989
Pedro Carlos Cipolini, appointed Bishop of Amparo, São Paulo in 2010

Suffragan dioceses
 Diocese of Amparo 
 Diocese of Bragança Paulista
 Diocese of Limeira
 Diocese of Piracicaba
 Diocese of São Carlos

Sources
 GCatholic.org
 Catholic Hierarchy

Roman Catholic dioceses in Brazil
Roman Catholic ecclesiastical provinces in Brazil
 
Christian organizations established in 1908
Roman Catholic dioceses and prelatures established in the 20th century
1908 establishments in Brazil